Zhao Zhiqing is a Chinese paralympic biathlete. She participated at the 2022 Winter Paralympics in the biathlon competition, and won the silver medal in the women's 12.5 kilometres with a time of 48:06.3 and won the bronze medal in the women's 6 kilometres standing event with a time of 20:05:1.

References

External links 
Paralympic Games profile

Living people
People from Zhangjiakou
Year of birth missing (living people)
Biathletes at the 2022 Winter Paralympics
Medalists at the 2022 Winter Paralympics
Paralympic silver medalists for China
Paralympic bronze medalists for China
Paralympic medalists in biathlon